Michael, Mike or Mick Kelly may refer to:

Politics
 Mike Kelly (Alaska politician) (1942–2016), Republican member of the Alaska House of Representatives
 Mike Kelly (Pennsylvania politician) (born 1948), politician and U.S. Representative from Pennsylvania
 Mike Kelly (Australian politician) (born 1960), Australian lawyer, soldier and politician
 Michael Kelly (Australian politician), New South Wales colonial politician
 Michael Kelly (Illinois politician) (born 1975), politician and athletic director from Illinois
 Michael Kelly (Lord Provost) (born 1940), former Lord Provost of the City of Glasgow, Scotland and businessman
 Michael John Kelly (1815–1890), political figure in Newfoundland

Sports

Association football
 Mike Kelly (footballer, born 1942), English football goalkeeper and coach
 Mike Kelly (footballer, born 1954), English football midfielder
 Michael Kelly (footballer, born 1877), English footballer
Michael Kelly (footballer, born 1996), Irish footballer for Carlisle United
 Michael Kelly (footballer, born 1997), Scottish footballer for Bristol Rovers

Baseball
 Michael Kelly (baseball)
 King Kelly (Michael Joseph Kelly, 1857–1894), Hall of Fame baseball player
 Mike Kelly (baseball, born 1896) (Bernard Francis "Mike" Kelly, 1896–1968), American baseball player, coach and manager
 Mike Kelly (outfielder) (born 1970), American baseball player
 Mike Kelly (pitcher) (1902–1982), American baseball player

Gridiron football
 Mike Kelly (American football coach) (born 1948), University of Dayton football coach, 1981–2007
 Mike Kelly (gridiron football) (born 1958), American college football and Canadian Football League coach

Other sports
 Mick Kelly (Australian footballer) (born 1952), Australian rules football player for Footscray
 Mike Kelly (basketball) (born 1967), American/Australian basketball coach and former player
 Michael Kelly (Gaelic footballer), Irish sportsperson who represented Donegal
 Mike Kelly (ice hockey) (born 1960), Canadian ice hockey executive
 Michael Kelly (sport shooter) (1872–1923), American Olympic sport shooter
 Mickey Kelly (1929–2011), Irish hurler
 Michael Kelly (athletic director), University of South Florida athletic director

Business
 Michael Eugene Kelly (1949–2013), automotive manufacturing entrepreneur and investment holding businessman
 Michael P. Kelly (born 1954), American architect and urban planner
 Michael Kelly, former president of Blockbuster LLC
 Michael J. Kelly (born 1957), American entrepreneur and media executive

Music
 Michael Kelly (tenor) (1762–1826), Irish actor, singer and composer
 Michael Patrick Kelly (born 1977), Irish-American singer, musician and composer
 Mike Kelly, drummer for the band the Mission UK
 Michael Schermick (born 1958), known professionally as Michael Kelly Smith, American guitar player
 Michael Kelly Guitars, American guitar, bass, and mandolin manufacturer

Writing
 Michael Kelly (editor) (1957–2003), American writer and editor
 Mike Kelly (journalist), American writer
 Michael Kelly (Irish journalist), Irish journalist
 Mick Kelly (writer), writer of Simpsons episode Little Orphan Millie

Other
 Michael Kelly (bishop) (1850–1940), fourth Roman Catholic Archbishop of Sydney
 Michael Kelly (physicist) (born 1949), New Zealand-British physicist
 Michael Kelly (actor) (born 1969), American actor

See also 
 Mike Kelley (disambiguation)
 Michael Joseph Kelly (disambiguation)